The 15th Alpini Regiment is an inactive regiment of the Italian Army's mountain infantry speciality, the Alpini, which distinguished itself in combat during World War I and World War II.

History 
The regiment was created 10 October 1992 by elevating the existing Alpini Battalion "Cividale" to regiment. Between 1 October 1909 and 30 September 1975 the battalion was one of the battalions of the 8th Alpini Regiment. After the 8th Alpini Regiment was disbanded during the 1975 Italian Army reform the "Cividale" battalion, based in Chiusaforte, became one of the battalions of the Alpine Brigade "Julia". As the traditions and flag of the 8th Alpini Regiment were assigned to the "Gemona" battalion, the Cividale battalion was granted a new war flag on 12 November 1976 by decree 846 of the President of the Italian Republic Giovanni Leone. The two Gold Medals of Military Valour awarded to the 8th Alpini Regiment, were duplicated for the new flag of the Cividale, and the Bronze Medal of Military Valour awarded to the Cividale for its conduct during the battle for Monte Cimone on 23-26 May 1916 was transferred from the flag of the 8th Alpini to the Cividale's flag.

For its conduct and work after the 1976 Friuli earthquake the battalion was awarded a Silver Medal of Army Valour, which was affixed to the battalion's war flag and added to the battalion's coat of arms.

In 1993 the regiment participated in the United Nations Operation in Mozambique for which it was awarded a Gold Cross of Army Merit, but with the downsizing of the Italian Army after the end of the Cold War the regiment was disbanded on 11 November 1995.

Structure 
When the regiment was disbanded it had the following structure:

  Regimental Command
  Command and Logistic Support Company
  Alpini Battalion "Cividale"
  16th Alpini Company
  20th Alpini Company
  76th Alpini Company
  115th Mortar Company

External links
 15th Alpini Regiment on vecio.it

Source 
 Franco dell'Uomo, Rodolfo Puletti: L'Esercito Italiano verso il 2000 - Volume Primo - Tomo I, Rome 1998, Stato Maggiore dell'Esercito - Ufficio Storico, page: 508

References 

Alpini regiments of Italy